The Korean Economic Review is a biannual peer-reviewed academic journal on economics. It is published by the Korean Economic Association and was established in 1985. It is a general interest economics journal. It is published twice a year, on January 1 and July 1 of every year. The editors-in-chief are Kwanho Shin, Manjong Lee (Korea University), and Chang Kim (Sik Sungkyunkwan University).

External links 
 

Economics journals
Publications established in 1985
Biannual journals
English-language journals
1985 establishments in South Korea